Nivar-e Sofla (also Romanized as Nīvār-e Soflá; also known as Nevārdūmen and Nīvār-e Pā’īn Jāvīd) is a village in Sornabad Rural District, Hamaijan District, Sepidan County, Fars Province, Iran. At the 2006 census, its population was 17, in 5 families.

References 

Populated places in Sepidan County